Acrocercops rhynchograpta is a moth of the family Gracillariidae. It is known from Brazil.

References

rhynchograpta
Gracillariidae of South America
Moths described in 1920